Ali Sikandar (6 April 1890 – 9 September 1960), known by his pen name as Jigar Moradabadi, was an Indian Urdu poet and ghazal writer. He received the Sahitya Akademi Award in 1958 for his poetry collection "Atish-e-Gul", and was the second poet (after Mohammad Iqbal) to be awarded an honorary D.Litt. by the Aligarh Muslim University.

Biography
He received oriental education in Arabic, Persian and Urdu in Moradabad, and started to work as a travelling salesman.

Jigar moved to Gonda, near Lucknow, where he befriended Asghar Gondvi.

He died on 9 September 1960 in Gonda.

Legacy
His Sufi Poem Yeh Hai Maikada Was Sung By Many Sufi Singers Like Sabri Brothers, Aziz Mian, Munni Begum & Attaullah Khan Esakhelvi

Acclaim
Jigar Moradabadi belonged to the classical school of ghazal writing and was a mentor to Majrooh Sultanpuri, who became a prominent lyricist in the Indian film industry and penned many popular songs in Urdu.

Jigar was only the second poet in the history of Aligarh Muslim University to be awarded an honorary D.Litt., the first was Muhammad Iqbal.

Faiz Ahmad Faiz, the distinguished Urdu poet and academic, regarded Jigar Moradabadi as a master craftsman in his field.

Jigar Fest - 2018 
Progressive Foundation organized three days Jigar Fest at Moradabad in 2018, to celebrate Jigar's Birthday.

Day 1 - Mushayra by Rahat Indori, Wasim Barelvi etc. 
Day 2 - Kawwali Nights by Chand Qadri 
Day 3 - Musical Night by Sheeba Alam

See also 
 List of Urdu-language writers

References

External links
 Jigar Moradabadi at Kavita Kosh
 Weaving ghazals on love, an article by Ashraf Faruqi on Jigar Moradabadi

Urdu-language poets
Recipients of the Sahitya Akademi Award in Urdu
1890 births
People from Moradabad
1960 deaths
Poets from Uttar Pradesh
20th-century Indian poets
Urdu-language poets from India